General Busch may refer to:

Andrew E. Busch (1970s–2010s), U.S. Air Force lieutenant general
Ernst Busch (field marshal) (1885–1945), German Wehrmacht general
Everett Busch (1893–1985), U.S. Army brigadier general
Rolland Busch (1920–1985), Australian Defence Force major general